The  1st Robert Awards ceremony was held in 1984 in Copenhagen, Denmark. Organized by the Danish Film Academy, the awards honoured the best in Danish and foreign film of 1983.

Honorees

Best Danish Film 
 Beauty and the Beast – Nils Malmros

Best Screenplay 
 Nils Malmros – Beauty and the Beast

Best Actor in a Leading Role 
 Jesper Klein – Beauty and the Beast

Best Actress in a Leading Role 
 Line Arlien-Søborg – Beauty and the Beast

Best Actor in a Supporting Role 
  –

Best Actress in a Supporting Role 
  –

Best Cinematography 
 Dan Laustsen –

Best Production Design 
 Palle Nybo Arestrup –

Best Costume Design 
 Annelise Hauberg –

Best Special Effects 
 Eg Norre –

Best Editing 
  –

Best Sound Design 
 Jan Juhler –

Best Score 
  –

Best Documentary Short 
 Motivation –  &

Best Foreign Film 
 Sophie's Choice – Alan Pakula

See also 

 1984 Bodil Awards

References

External links 
  

Robert Awards ceremonies
1983 film awards
1984 in Denmark
1980s in Copenhagen